The 2017 Thai Women's League (also known as the Muang Thai Women's League for sponsorship reasons) was the 4th season of the Thai Women's League, the top Thai professional league for women's association football clubs, since its establishment in 2009. A total of 10 teams will compete in the league.  The season began on 22 April 2017. Fixtures for the 2017 season were announced on 21 April 2017.

BG Bundit Asia are the defending champions, having won the Thai Women's Premier League title the previous season.

Teams

Locations

Bangkok
Bangkok
Chaba Kaew 16
Chaba Kaew 19
Dhurakij Pundit
Buriram 
BRU Burirat
Chonburi
Chonburi
Khon Kaen
BG Bundit Asia
Lampang
Lampang Grand Sport
Nakhon Si Thammarat
Nakhon Si Lady SS
Sisaket
Sisaket

Personnel and sponsoring
Note: Flags indicate national team as has been defined under FIFA eligibility rules. Players may hold more than one non-FIFA nationality.

League table

Results

Round 1

Round 2

Round 3

Round 4

Round 5

Round 6

Round 7

Season statistics

Top scorers

Hat-tricks

Clean sheets

See also
 2017 Thai League 1
 2017 Thai League 2
 2017 Thai League 3
 2017 Thai League 4

2017
Thailand
Thailand
2017 in Thai football leagues